The Lao Wiang, sometimes also referred to as Lao Wieng, are a Tai sub-ethnic group of the Isan region. Approximately 50,000 self-proclaimed Lao Wiang live in villages throughout Thailand, especially the provinces of Prachinburi, Udon Thani, Nakhon Pathom, Chai Nat, Lopburi, Saraburi, Phetchaburi, and Roi Et with a significant number in Bangkok.

Alternate names

The Lao Wiang are also referred to as Tai Wiang (ไทเวียง), Lao Vientiane (ลาวเวียงจันทน์), Tai Vientiane (ไทเวียงจันทน์) or simply as Wiang (เวียง).  These names are also used in Laos to refer to the inhabitants of Vientiane or its descendants in Thailand.  Many who are in fact Lao Wiang may only consider themselves Isan or Lao.

History
The Lao Wiang, as their name suggests, are descendants of Lao people from the Vientiane (Wiang Chan) region (Thai: เวียงจันทน์) in modern-day Laos.  After the fall of Lanxang, the three successor kingdoms were overrun by Siam and forced population transfers by the Siamese into Isan were undertaken.  Much of Isan was settled this way, and is one of the main reasons for the shared Lao culture of Laos and Isan.  Originally slaves and forced into providing corvée labour, the Lao Wiang were freed and integrated into the general Isan population.

Culture
The Lao Wiang are a sub-group of the general Isan (ethnic Lao of northeastern Thailand) distinguished from other Isan people by the location of their ancestors.  Most have assumed either Thai or Isan identity, but some maintain their distinctiveness.  Like their neighbours, they share Theravada Buddhism, Isan language, and rice farming, with only slight differences in traditional clothing and dialect.

References

External links

Tai peoples
Ethnic groups in Thailand